Irshad Ahamad (born 10 September 1996) is a Nepalese cricketer. He made his List A debut in the 2015–17 ICC World Cricket League Championship on 16 November 2015 against Papua New Guinea.

References

External links
 

1996 births
Living people
Nepalese cricketers
People from Parsa District